The 2022 NASCAR Pinty's Series was the sixteenth season of the Pinty's Series, the national stock car racing series in Canada sanctioned by NASCAR. It began with the NTN Ultimate Bearing Experience 250 at Sunset Speedway on May 14 and concluded with the race at Delaware Speedway on September 25.

Louis-Philippe Dumoulin entered the season as the defending series champion. Marc-Antoine Camirand won the championship, his first title in the Pinty's series.

Teams and drivers

Complete Schedule

Limited Schedule

Schedule
On 9 December 2021, NASCAR announced the 2022 schedule. It included an inaugural race at Ohsweken Speedway, which will become the first dirt track race in series history, after being cancelled for the 2020 season, as well as one at Eastbound International Speedway. It also brought the return of the west coast swing for the series.

Results and standings

Races

Drivers' championship

(key) Bold – Pole position awarded by time. Italics – Pole position set by final practice results or Owners' points. L –Led race lap (1 point). * – Led most race laps (1 point). (R) - Rookie of the Year candidate.

See also
 2022 NASCAR Cup Series
 2022 NASCAR Xfinity Series
 2022 NASCAR Camping World Truck Series
 2022 ARCA Menards Series
 2022 ARCA Menards Series East
 2022 ARCA Menards Series West
 2022 NASCAR Whelen Modified Tour
 2022 NASCAR Mexico Series
 2022 NASCAR Whelen Euro Series
 2022 SRX Series

References

External links
 
Pinty's Series Standings and Statistics for 2022

Pinty's Series
NASCAR Pinty's Series